Uzbektelecom joint-stock company is the largest telecommunications operator in Uzbekistan, which covers the entire territory of the Republic with its network. 

Using its telecommunications network built on the basis of modern technologies, the company provides services:
 rent channels to operators and providers of fixed and mobile communications
 international and long-distance communications
 provides all types of voice and data transmission services
 Internet access
 video conferencing
 mobile and landline communications in CDMA-450 and GSM standards
 organizes channels for broadcasting TV and radio programs

The Uztelecom company is also the largest provider of telecommunications services for government agencies and departments.

Uzbektelecom JSC constantly interacts with international telecommunications organizations, participates in international telecommunications projects, and carries out bilateral cooperation with foreign operators and manufacturers of telecommunications equipment.

Uzbektelecom actively cooperates with the International telecommunication Union (ITU), the Regional Commonwealth in the field of communications( RCC), the Intelsat satellite communications organization, is a member of the Council of RCC operators, etc. The company's local telecommunications network consists of more than 2 thousand PBX with a capacity of more than 2.0 million numbers. Digitalization of the local telecommunications network has significantly improved the quality of telecommunication networks, provided new types of services to the network's subscribers, and allowed organizing high-speed dial-up Internet access for a wide range of users.

The company's transport network is based on fiber-optic and radio relay communication lines using modern SDH network technologies that provide multi-level network management. To ensure high quality of new types of services and expand their range, a gradual transition to high-speed transmission systems such as STM-1/16/64, DWDM and IP/MPLS is being implemented. The company provides access to the global Internet via the international packet switching center (ICPC) to all providers in the Republic.

Access to the Internet and data transmission networks of Uzbektelecom JSC is provided by the company's branches via dedicated lines using xDSL and RadioEthernet technology and dial-up access. The list of data network services provided by Uzbektelecom includes Internet access, VPN, video conferencing, development and construction of corporate networks, etc. Through the international voice gateway VoIP of Uzbektelecom, its branches provide international telephone services using prepaid cards.

Uzbektelecom JSC provides international telephone communication through two international switching centers, maintaining partnerships with more than 20 international operators in the field of traditional communications. The general brand of Uzbektelecom JSC has been the Uztelecom trademark since 2011. Through a single sales office, the Company provides subscribers with mobile communication services, Internet connection, television, city telephony, and cloud storage.

Under the General brand of Uztelecom and the slogan "national operator", a range of traditional services for the retail sector is provided, as well as a full range of services for operators in the domestic and international markets. Uztelecom also includes a range of telecommunications services for the corporate sector: fixed telephony, wired and wireless broadband (broadband access), PD (data transmission), VPN (virtual private networks), IP telephony, IPTV, virtual office PBX, videoconferencing, mobile communications, mobile PD. The company also provides new generation telecommunications services for the retail sector and small businesses: services based on IP technologies — Internet access, IP telephony, IPTV, universal payment cards for IP telephony and Internet services, etc. At the same time, mobile communication services are provided based on the CDMA-450 and GSM standards.

Uzbektelecom JSC has stakes in eight joint ventures that provide mobile and fixed-line, long-distance and international communications, data transmission and Internet services.

Uzbektelecom JSC is the undisputed market leader in telecommunications services for public authorities at all levels, state institutions and organizations, as well as consumers - individuals.

The high quality and reliability of the Company's services are confirmed by certificates of compliance with the quality management system.

Since November 18, 2013, Uzbektelecom JSC was awarded a certificate of compliance with the requirements of the O'z DSt ISO 9001:2009 (ISO 9001:2008) standard based on the results of the certification audit.

On January 12, 2017, Uzbektelecom JSC conducted a recertification audit and confirmed the certificate of compliance with the requirements of the O'z DSt ISO 9001:2009 (ISO 9001:2008).

In 2018, Uzbektelecom JSC successfully passed certification with the transition to the new version of The o'z DSt ISO 9001:2015 standard.

The quality management system of Uzbektelecom JSC covers: design, construction, operation and provision of telecommunications services.

History

1992–2000 

Uzbektelecom was established in 1992.

In 1995—1996, the state enterprise began to be privatized through the formation of multiple joint stock companies, including Uzbektelecom International. In 1997, the Ministry of Communications of the Republic of Uzbekistan was reorganized into the Uzbek Post and Telecommunications Agency, followed by the establishment of regional joint stock companies providing telecommunications services.

2000–2005 
From 2000 through 2002, Uzbektelecom was reorganized from a holding company to an operating company, merging the regional telecommunications companies into Uzbektelecom.

In 2003, Uzbektelecom began providing CDMA-450 wireless radio access. As of 2003, the wireless radio access system was working in Samarkand and the Djizak regions. In 2004 and 2005, Uzbektelecom improved international telephone access as well as internet access.

2006—present 
As of 2007, mobile CDMA communication services were available in all regions of Uzbekistan. In 2011, Uzbektelecom was rebranded as Uztelecom, with sub-brands Uzmobile and Uzonline. In 2012 and 2013, Uztelecom continued to expand its coverage, providing CDMA wireless services to 71% of the country, and installing fiber-optic lines between cities within Uzbekistan and to international destinations.

References

External links
Official website

 
Uzbekistan